Radisson Montevideo Victoria Plaza Hotel is a hotel on the central Plaza Independencia in the Old City of Montevideo, Uruguay, operated by Radisson Hotels. The Radisson Montevideo has 232 rooms and contains a casino and is served by the Restaurante Arcadia, on the 25th floor. At 115 meters, it is on the list of tallest buildings in Uruguay.

External links

References

Hotels in Montevideo
Radisson Hotels
Ciudad Vieja, Montevideo
Convention centers in Uruguay
Hotels established in 1996
Hotel buildings completed in 1996